J-U-N-K is a 1920 American film produced by Morris R. Schlank.

Cast 
Madge Kirby as A society bud
Jim Welch as Her father
John J. Richardson as A Count
Vernon Dent as The junk dealer
Hank Mann as His helper

External links 

 

1920 films
American silent short films
American black-and-white films
1920 comedy films
1920 short films
American comedy short films
1920s American films
Silent American comedy films